Põlev lipp is a novel by Estonian author Karl Ristikivi. It depicts King Conradin's Italian campaign. It was first published in 1961 in Lund, Sweden by Eesti Kirjanike Kooperatiiv (Estonian Writers' Cooperative). 

In Estonia it was published in 1990.

A translation into the French by Jean Pascal Ollivry, entitled L'étendard en flammes, was published in Paris in 2005.

References

1961 novels
Novels by Karl Ristikivi